The 1998 Newsweek Champions Cup and the State Farm Evert Cup were tennis tournaments played on outdoor hard courts. It was the 25th edition of the Indian Wells Masters and was part of the Super 9 of the 1998 ATP Tour and of Tier I of the 1998 WTA Tour. Both the men's and women's tournaments took place at the Grand Champions Resort in Indian Wells, California in the United States from March 5 through March 15, 1998.

Finals

Men's singles

 Marcelo Ríos defeated  Greg Rusedski 6–3, 6–7(15–17), 7–6(7–4), 6–4
 It was Ríos' 2nd title of the year and the 8th of his career. It was his 1st Super 9 title of the year and his 2nd overall.

Women's singles

 Martina Hingis defeated  Lindsay Davenport 6–3, 6–4
 It was Hingis' 5th title of the year and the 30th of her career. It was her 1st Tier I title of the year and her 4th overall.

Men's doubles

 Jonas Björkman /  Patrick Rafter defeated  Todd Martin /  Richey Reneberg 6–4, 7–6
 It was Björkman's 2nd title of the year and the 18th of his career. It was Rafter's 2nd title of the year and the 9th of his career.

Women's doubles

 Lindsay Davenport /  Natasha Zvereva defeated  Alexandra Fusai /  Nathalie Tauziat 6–4, 2–6, 6–4
 It was Davenport's 2nd title of the year and the 33rd of her career. It was Zvereva's 1st title of the year and the 74th of her career.

References

External links
 
 Association of Tennis Professionals (ATP) tournament profile

Newsweek Champions Cup
State Farm Evert Cup
Indian Wells Masters
Newsweek Champions Cup
Newsweek Champions Cup and the State Farm Evert Cup
Newsweek Champions Cup and the State Farm Evert Cup